Tontine Trust is a Fintech company proposing to provide pension benefits on a digital platform, based on the "tontine" principle in which subscribers pool their longevity risk in contrast with annuities.

History 
Tontine Trust was founded as a Gibraltar-based blockchain project in Q3 2017. The project promoted a token named the TON which would be used as a clearing currency. 

The project received criticism in the press  on several critical areas, including misrepresentation of product readiness, regulatory approval, and market suitability. 

After an initial token sale in Q1 2018, the project continued with marketing efforts but no subsequent product was released.

Trademark 
The company was granted a European trademark for tontines as a pension product. The trademark includes the phrase "Live, Long & Prosper" which initially drew opposition from CBS Studios; however, CBS withdrew their opposition.

References

External links 
Organisation website

Financial services companies of Hong Kong